Yang Piang is a tambon (subdistrict) of Omkoi District, in Chiang Mai Province, Thailand. In 2017 it had a population of 9,541 people.

Administration

Central administration
The tambon is divided into 17 administrative villages (mubans).

Local administration
The area of the subdistrict is covered by the subdistrict administrative organization (SAO) Yang Piang (องค์การบริหารส่วนตำบลยางเปียง).

References

External links
Thaitambon.com on Yang Piang

Tambon of Chiang Mai province
Populated places in Chiang Mai province